Givenchy is a French luxury fashion and perfume house. It hosts the brand of haute couture and ready-to-wear clothing, accessories, perfumes and cosmetics of Parfums Givenchy. The house of Givenchy was founded in 1952 by designer Hubert de Givenchy and is a member of Chambre Syndicale de la Haute Couture et du Prêt-à-Porter. It is currently owned by luxury conglomerate LVMH.

From 2 May 2017 until 10 April 2020, its artistic director was Clare Waight Keller, the first woman to hold that position.

History

Formation and first years

In 1952, Hubert de Givenchy founded his own luxury house and launched a new collection Les Séparables with some floaty skirts and puffy blouses made from raw cotton.

Givenchy achieved critical acclaim with Vogue magazine praising his "wonderful first collection" 14. The collection included the Bettina Blouse a white shirt named in honour of Bettina Graziani, which was then painted in one of René Gruau's works.

The New York Times magazine published an article entitled "A Star Is Born" and l’Album du Figaro also wrote a feature stating that "In one night, Hubert de Givenchy became one of fashion’s most famous children with his first collection."

Models such as Suzy Parker and Dorian Leigh became muses of the house.

In terms of innovation, he used 'shirting', a raw cotton similar to pattern paper, to create his chic and casual collections.

In 1954, Hubert de Givenchy presented the first shirt dress (which later evolved in to a sack dress in 1957). He was the first high fashion designer to create a luxury ready-to-wear clothing line, called "Givenchy Université", which was produced in Paris using machinery imported from the United States.

1950s: Balenciaga and Givenchy

In 1956, both Cristóbal Balenciaga and Hubert de Givenchy presented their collection in New York during a charity gala in aid of the American hospital in Paris.

Expansion
In 1969, Hubert de Givenchy launched his fashion line for men, "Gentleman Givenchy". The boutique was opened in November on Avenue George V.

On the advice of Cristóbal Balenciaga, Givenchy developed his licences in the 1970s, in order to protect the Haute Couture collections.

During this period, the House of Givenchy diversified its activities to create shoes, jewellery, ties, tableware, upholstery and kimono. Hubert de Givenchy was chosen to design the interior of Hilton hotels around the world, and even a car (the Continental Mark V).

Hubert de Givenchy was elected the personality of the year 1979 and the most elegant man of the year by The Best Magazine.

In 1982, a retrospective presided by Audrey Hepburn was organized by the Fashion Institute of Technology of New York.

The following year Hubert de Givenchy was named « chevalier de la Légion d’Honneur » and in 1985, Jacques Lang, the French minister of the Culture, gave him the Oscar dedicated to the art of elegance during a celebration at the Opera in Paris.

Departure of Hubert de Givenchy

In 1988, Givenchy joined LVMH Moët Hennessy Louis Vuitton.

Hubert de Givenchy left the company in 1995. He was succeeded by a variety of young British creators including John Galliano, Alexander McQueen and Julien MacDonald.

2005–2017, Riccardo Tisci
The reins for both collections were passed on to Riccardo Tisci in 2005 when he was named artistic director of womenswear. Riccardo Tisci has proposed to the House his own style and influences. By changing the house codes, Riccardo Tisci adds some dark and sensual romanticism touch.

Philippe Fortunato, the former chief operating of LVMH Moet Hennessy Vuitton SA – China, is the current Chief Operating at Givenchy.

Givenchy designs have been worn by a number of celebrities on red carpet occasions, including Rooney Mara at the 2012 Academy awards. Also responsible for working with Madonna designing her costumes for her Sticky & Sweet tour as well as the 2012 Super Bowl Halftime Show.

In 2016, Tisci launched a sportswear collaboration with Nike called NikeLab x RT: Training Redefined aimed at Olympic athletes for the 2016 Summer Olympics as everyday gym users.

In February 2017, Riccardo Tisci announced that he would be leaving Givenchy, after twelve years working as the brands Creative Director.

2017–2020, Clare Waight Keller 
The House of Givenchy announced the appointment of Clare Waight Keller as artistic director, effective 2 May 2017. Waight Keller took on all creative responsibilities, including Women's and Men's Ready-to-wear and accessories collections, as well as Haute Couture. Meghan Markle wore a gown from Claire Waight Keller at her wedding to Prince Harry on 19 May 2018.

After successfully running three consecutive combined shows under the assistance of Keller, the brand announced to bring back the menswear collection calendar for the autumn/winter 2019 season.

2020-Present, Matthew Williams 
In June 2020, Givenchy announced the hiring of Matthew Williams, a stylist and designer best known for co-founding the influential streetwear brand 1017 ALYX 9SM. Williams has brought an edgier aesthetic to Givenchy, and his work is often seen on celebrities such as Kendall Jenner and Bella Hadid. The commercial and critical response to his work at Givenchy has been mixed, with Carine Roitfeld saying she cannot identify the Givenchy woman; "it's not a strong DNA."

Icons and the cinema

Audrey Hepburn

In 1953, Audrey Hepburn and Hubert de Givenchy met by the intermediary of Gladys de Segonzac in a way to create her costumes for Sabrina by Billy Wilder. As Gladys de Segonzac had organized the meeting with 'Miss Hepburn', the fashion designer thought that he was going to receive Katharine Hepburn. Dressed in a pink and white gingham privateer, a T-shirt and a gondolier hat, the British actress received some prototypes of the future collection. Audrey Hepburn decided to wear Givenchy clothes on and off the screen, such as in Sabrina (1954), Love in the Afternoon (1957), Funny Face (1957), Breakfast at Tiffany's (1961), Charade (1963), Paris When It Sizzles (1963), How to Steal a Million (1965) and Bloodline (1979).

Celebrities
Givenchy attracted many other celebrities, including the likes of Lauren Bacall, Babe Paley, Michael Norman, Greta Garbo, Elizabeth Taylor, Marlène Dietrich, Jacqueline Kennedy-Onassis, Beyoncé Knowles, Princess Grace of Monaco, Michèle Bennett, and even Wallis Simpson, for whom he created some special garment bags to keep the duchess's orders from being viewed by other clients. The collection of attire (dress, coat, perfume, etc.) furnished for Simpson would later become known as 'blue Wallis'.

Today, Givenchy dresses many Hollywood stars, including Cate Blanchett, Emma Stone, Lady Gaga, Julianne Moore, Julia Roberts, Rooney Mara, and others. In May 2019, Givenchy confirmed that singer Ariana Grande would be the new face of its Fall and Winter campaign that was unveiled that July.
On February 10, 2021, K-pop group Aespa became global ambassadors for Givenchy. This made them first K-pop artists chosen as such by the French fashion house.

Cinema

 In 1958, director Otto Preminger photographed David Niven; Jean Seberg and Deborah Kerr in Givenchy on the shooting of ‘Bonjour Tristesse’.
 Beat the Devil (Plus fort que le diable), 1954 realized by John Huston
 Sabrina, 1954 realized by Billy Wilder, with Audrey Hepburn
 Love in the afternoon (Ariane), 1957 realized by Billy Wilder, with Audrey Hepburn 
 La vérité, 1960, realized by H, -G Clouzot
 Charade, 1963, realized by Stanley Donen, with Audrey Hepburn 
 Paris When It Sizzles (Deux têtes folles), 1964, realized by Richard Quine, with Audrey Hepburn 
 Bloodline (Lié par le sang), 1979 realized by Terence Young, with Audrey Hepburn

Operations
As of 2013, the company's operations were divided between: "Europe accounts for 42 percent of the business, China 18 percent, Asia-Pacific 14 percent, America 12 percent, the Middle East 7 percent, Japan 4 percent, and the rest of the world 3 percent."

Ad campaigns
The Fall 2010 collection from Givenchy and Riccardo Tisci featured a transgender person for the first time.

References

External links 

 Givenchy.com official website 
 
 

French companies established in 1952
8th arrondissement of Paris
Clothing companies established in 1952
Clothing brands of France
Companies based in Paris
Fashion accessory brands
Haute couture
High fashion brands
Luxury brands
LVMH brands
Perfume houses
Taffin de Givenchy family